Kvål may refer to:

Places
Kvål, Innlandet, a village in Ringsaker municipality in Innlandet county, Norway
Kvål, Trøndelag, a village in Melhus municipality in Trøndelag county, Norway
Kvål Station, a railway station in Melhus municipality in Trøndelag county, Norway

See also
 KVAL (disambiguation)